Nocardioides solisilvae is a Gram-positive, aerobic and rod-shaped bacterium from the genus Nocardioides which has been isolated from forest soil in Himachal Pradesh, India.

References 

solisilvae
Bacteria described in 2015